2014 Yunnan earthquake may refer to one of three different earthquakes in Yunnan Province, China:
2014 Yingjiang earthquake, a 5.6 Mw earthquake in Yingjiang County which occurred in May
2014 Ludian earthquake, a 6.1 Mw earthquake which occurred in Ludian County in early August
2014 Jinggu earthquake, a 6.1 Mw earthquake which occurred in Jinggu County in early October

See also
List of earthquakes in 2014
List of earthquakes in China